Guillermo Muñoz Ramírez (born 20 October 1961) is a Mexican former football defender, who was nicknamed "El Turbo". He has 20 caps for the Mexico national team between 1987 and 1993, and on the squad at the 1993 Copa América. He made his debut on 17 January 1987.

Career
Muñoz joined C.F. Monterrey in 1984, and played for the club until 1993. He played in 13 Clasicos against local rivals UANL Tigres, a club he would join late in his career  during the 1995-96 season.

References

1961 births
Living people
Footballers from Nuevo León
Mexico international footballers
Association football defenders
C.F. Monterrey players
1991 CONCACAF Gold Cup players
1993 Copa América players
Club León footballers
Tigres UANL footballers
Liga MX players
Sportspeople from Monterrey
Mexican footballers